Ensenada Honda, also known as "Puerto Grande" and "Bahía Honda" for its elongated shape, is the largest inlet on the island of Culebra, Puerto Rico.

Geography 
Since the 19th century, observers have deemed Ensenada Honda among the safest Caribbean harbors. Its irregular coastline features rocky cliffs, sandy beaches, and mangrove forests. Three smaller inlets gate the cavernous cove: "Malena" and "Dakity" to the west, and "Mosquito" to the east. A number of distinct coral specimens inhabit the area around Culebra, and some communities have flourished at the very bay's entrance. They form bars barely above sea level and block portions of its opening.

Environmental history 
For most of the 20th century (1902-1975) the bay served as grounds for military training, as wreckage left from the time reveals. Explosions and the resulting contamination left pulverized underwater craters and diminished the health of sea life. But low-tech, community-based programs and coral grafting have expanded the reefs' fields and increased their bio-diversity.   The bay is today an eco-tourist destination, celebrated for its turtles, and the center of the local fishing industry.

See also 

 Ensenada Honda (Ceiba, Puerto Rico)
 San Juan Bay
 Mayaguez Bay
 Culebra Island giant anole
 Flamenco Beach

Notes

References 

Culebra, Puerto Rico